Blue Kentucky Girl is the sixth studio album by American country music artist Emmylou Harris, released in 1979. The album features Harris delving into more traditional country than the country-rock sound of her previous releases.  Songs include work by Willie Nelson and Gram Parsons.  Rodney Crowell's "Even Cowgirls Get the Blues" featured harmonies by Dolly Parton and Linda Ronstadt, and came out of the women's ill-fated 1978 recording sessions, where they first attempted to record a "trio" album (nearly a full decade before they actually succeeded in doing so).

The album won the 1980 Grammy for Best Female Country Vocal Performance.  "Beneath Still Waters" became Harris' fourth No. 1 hit; covers of the Drifters' 1960 hit "Save the Last Dance for Me" and the album's title track (originally recorded by Loretta Lynn) were top ten hits on the US country charts.

In 2006, the album ranked #20 on CMT's 40 Greatest Albums in Country Music.

Track listing

Personnel
Brian Ahern – acoustic guitar, high-strung guitar, bass, percussion, 6-string banjo
Duke Bardwell – bass
Mike Bowden – bass
Tony Brown – piano
James Burton – electric guitar
Rodney Crowell – acoustic guitar, high-strung guitar
Lincoln Davis Jr. – accordion
Hank DeVito – pedal steel
Don Everly – duet vocals
Emory Gordy Jr. – bass
Glen Hardin – piano, string arrangements
Emmylou Harris – vocals, acoustic guitar, electric guitar
Ben Keith – pedal steel
Albert Lee – acoustic guitar, electric guitar, mandolin
Dolly Parton – backing vocals
Bill Payne – piano
Mickey Raphael – harmonica
Linda Ronstadt – backing vocals
Ricky Skaggs – fiddle, 5-string fiddle, mandolin, backing vocals
Fayssoux Starling – backing vocals
Tanya Tucker – duet vocals
Ron Tutt – drums
John Ware – drums
Cheryl White – duet vocals, backing vocals
Sharon White – duet vocals, backing vocals

Technical
Brian Ahern – producer, engineer
Donivan Cowart – engineer
Bradley Hartman – engineer
Stuart Taylor – engineer

Charts

Weekly charts

Year-end charts

References

 Emmylou Harris Blue Kentucky Girl liner notes

Emmylou Harris albums
1979 albums
Albums produced by Brian Ahern (producer)
Warner Records albums
Covers albums